Kunwar Nau Nihal Singh (9 March 1821 – 5 November 1840) was the third Maharaja of the Sikh Empire. He was the only son of Maharaja Kharak Singh and his consort,  Maharani Chand Kaur. He was known as Yuvraj Kunwar Nau Nihal Singh. He was also known as Bhanwar Singh or Bhanwar Sa or Kunwar Sa means Respected Young Prince. Bhawar means Son of Kunwar or Son  of Thakur. His reign began with the dethronement of his father Maharaja Kharak Singh and ended with his death at the age of 19 on the day of his father's funeral.

Early life

Nau Nihal Singh was born on February 11, 1821, to Yuvraj Kharak Singh and his first wife, Chand Kaur. He was the grandson of Sher-e-Punjab Maharaja Ranjit Singh and Maharani Datar Kaur of the Nakai Misl, he grew up very close to his grandparents. His father was the heir of his grandfather- thus making him second in line of succession to the throne of Punjab.

In April 1837 at the age of sixteen he was married to Bibi Nanaki Kaur Atariwala, daughter Sham Singh Attariwala (1790–1846) of the village of Attari in Amritsar district of Punjab. She was the only wife to hold the title of Maharani, she died in 1856. His wedding was planned by his grandmother, Datar Kaur. The occasion was marked by a display of extraordinary splendour and lavishness. He was secondly, married to Sahib Kaur Gilwaliwala, daughter of Sardar Gurdit Singh Gilwaliwala, of Amritsar she died in 1841 after giving birth to their stillborn son, posthumously. His third marriage was to Bhadauran Kanwar Sahiba, daughter of a Sardar of Bhadaur. His last wife was Katochan Sahiba, daughter of Mian Rai Singh, of Lambagraon. His last two wives committed Sati in Lahore on 6 November 1840 on his funeral.

Early military campaigns and administration 

Like his father, he was brought him up in his family's martial tradition and assigned to a variety of military expeditions. At the age of 13 in 1834 he participated in the Peshawar campaign. He was then appointed to administer the country in the Attock region. The same year, the province of Peshawar was farmed out to him for an annual payment of Rs 12,00,000. In 1835, he suppressed a revolt in the Derajat and Torik.

In 1836, he accompanied his father to the borders of Sindh to confront the Talpurian amirs. He took part in the operations of the Khyber in April 1839, he commanded a Sikh army which proceeded to Peshawar to assist Colonel Wade`s contingent on its march from Punjab to Kabul across the Khyber Pass.

In 1837 he was awarded with Kaukab-i-Iqbal-i-Punjab by Maharaja Ranjit Singh. Upon his father's ascension he became the Tikka Kanwar (Crown prince) of Sarkār-ē-Khālsā. Nau Nihal was raised outside the court politics at Lahore however at the age of eighteen, and forced by his father's incapacity he returned to Lahore. He was instructed to govern in the name of his father under the direction of the vizier, Dhian Singh Dogra. When Kharak Singh became gravely ill, the court physician Johann Martin Honigberger noted that despite his father begging him to see him every day, Nau Nihal rarely visited his father.

Death 

Nau Nihal was popular with the royal courtiers and the general public, and was seen as a worthy successor to his father during the latter's sickness. After Kharak Singh died on 5 November 1840, Nau Nihal performed his last rites beside the Ravi River in Lahore. After the ceremony, he started returning to the palace via the Hazuri Bagh, where a massive block of stone from a gate fell upon him and two of his companions. One of the companions - Udham Singh (nephew of Dhian Singh)- broke his neck and died on the spot.

According to Alexander Gardner, who was just steps behind Nau Nihal when the incident took place, the prince had sustained only minor injuries during this episode: he was well enough to walk on his own, and agreed to be taken on a stretcher only because of Gardner's insistence. However, when the court physician Johann Martin Honigberger came to attend Nau Nihal in a tent, he observed that the prince's skull had been crushed, and the bedsheet was covered with blood and brain tissue. Dhian Singh insisted that the prince had suffered these injuries during the alleged accident in Hazuri Bagh. Nau Nihal died hours later, although the courtiers did not make this news public until three days later in an attempt to avoid panic. According to Gardner, five artillery men had carried Nau Nihal from Hazuri Bagh to the tent: two of these men died under mysterious circumstances, two went on leave and never re-joined the service, and one disappeared without explanation.L.H. Griffin in The Punjab Chiefs says,"The only reason for the mystery which shrouded the death-bed of the Prince, was the necessity which Dhyan Singh felt for keeping the fatal news from being generally known until the arrival of Sher Singh. If there had been an organised plot, the Raja would have taken care that Sher Singh should have been present in Lahore at the time of the catastrophe. The absence of Sher Singh proves the innocence of the Raja (Dhian Singh)".

The contemporary English political correspondence, which details even the most insignificant happenings at the Darbar,  makes no references to any suspicion entertained in any quarters regarding the Jammu Rajas. It has been asserted that as far as contemporary European writers go, it was their studied policy to denounce the Jammu Rajas, especially Dhian Singh, because of his anti-European attitude which he had consistently maintained throughout his career. On enquiry into the matter of the 'accident', J.M. Honigberger found "more reason to suppose that the partisans of Kurruck Singh and Chet Singh were the authors of this plot against the prince, as he had intended to ask them for an account of their perfidious behaviour during his father's long illness... He (the prince) to order seven of their houses to be closed and inquiries to be made".

Nau Nihal was cremated on 6 November 1840 at the age of 19. His mother Maharani Chand Kaur became the Empress of Sikh Empire assuming the title Malika Muqaddasa (immaculate empress). She was killed by poisoning her food on 11 June 1842.

Succession

After Nau Nihal's death, a court faction proclaimed his uncle Sher Singh as the rightful heir, while another declared his mother Chand Kaur as the ruler. The faction supporting Chand Kaur hoped that Nau Nihal's pregnant wife would give birth to a son. However, the widow gave birth to a stillborn baby six months later, and Sher Singh besieged Lahore with a 70,000-strong army. Ultimately, Chand Kaur agreed to acknowledge Sher Singh's claim to the throne in return for a generous settlement and safe passage, and Sher Singh was crowned on 18 January 1841. A few months later, on 11 June 1842, Chand Kaur's maids killed her by crushing her skull, just like her son had died. While being punished by Prime Minister Dhian Singh, they insisted that they had killed Chand Kaur on Sher Singh's orders.

Nau Nihal Singh had ordered the construction of a bunga (tower) in the complex of Tarn Taran Sahib, one of the Holiest Sikh Shrines in the Majha Region of Punjab Kingdom.

Child adoptions
When Nau Nihal Singh was declared as Maharaja of Sikh Empire, he adopted his cousin's son, Bhagwan Singh from the Kanhaiya Misl. 

His second wife, Sahib Kaur was pregnant at the time of his death and posthumously gave birth to their son, Jawahar Singh who was a stillborn. It is alleged that she was poised with the motive of terminating her pregnancy. Sohan Lal Suri claimed that Sher Singh gave the wives of Nau Nihal Singh medicines to terminate their pregnancies.

References

Bibliography 

 

 Gulabnama: A history of Maharaja Gulab Singh of Jammu & Kashmir-Diwan Kripa Ram;Sukhdev Singh Charak;Anita Charak Billawria 

1821 births
1840 deaths
Punjabi people
Indian Sikhs
Nau Nihal Singh
19th-century Indian monarchs
People from Lahore